Lauenförde-Beverungen is a railway station located in Lauenförde, Germany and is across the river from Beverungen. The station is located on the Sollingbahn and the train services are operated by NordWestBahn.

Train services
The station is served by the following services:

Local services  Ottbergen – Bad Karlshafen – Bodenfelde – Göttingen

References

Railway stations in Lower Saxony